Parijatham is a Tamil language film released in 1950, starring T. R. Mahalingam, M. V. Rajamma and B. S. Saroja.

Plot 
The film has three story lines. 
The first line which is the first part is about the well known myth of Naragasura. Naragasura, the demon king has invincible powers due to the boons he had received from Devas and with all that he wreaks havoc on everyone. Narada knows that only Bama, the wife of Krishna who was Naragasura's mother in the previous birth can annihilate him. Narada adept in his covert ways to achieve his goals subtly gifts a parijatham flower to Krishna and make him in turn gift it to his first wife Rukmani. As expected the demon king dies at the hands of Bama but not before making a request that his day of death be celebrated by people as Deepavali. 
The next story line has the same parijatham that breeds enmity in Bama against Rukmani. Finally she understands that Rukmani's devotion to Krishna far exceeds her own, a humbling experience.
There is a third line which is a comic interlude that intersects the film throughout. N.S.krishnan, T.A.Mathuram and side kicks Kaka Radhakrishnan and Pulimootai Ramasamy take care of that.

Cast
Cast according to the opening credits of the film

Male
 T. R. Mahalingam as Krishnan
 N. S. Krishnan as Shri Kaman
 R. Balasubramaniam as Narakasuran
 Nagarcoil Mahadevan as Naradar
 T. K. Sampangi as Indran
 C. S. D. Singh as Muran
 Pulimoottai Ramasami as Fake Naradar
 C. S. Pandian as Kakkai
 T. V. Radhakrishnan as Brother
 Pappa Narayana Iyer as Kasyapar

Female
 M. V. Rajamma as Rukmani
 B. S. Saroja as Satyabhama
 T. A. Mathuram as Senthamarai
 T. S. Jaya as Lalitha
 P. G. Parvathi as Shyamala
 C. Vedhavalli as Indrani
 S. Menaka as Krishnamani

Dance
 Thara Chowdhry
 Lalitha-Padmini
 S. Kandamma

Production 
The film was produced by S. K. Sundararama Iyer under the banner Lavanya Pictures and was shot at Newtone and Vauhini studios. The film was directed by K. S. Gopalakrishnan B. A. Screenplay and dialogues were written by Elangovan. Jithen Banerji was in charge of cinematography while Kumaradevan was the operative cameraman. Editing was done by A. V. Subba Rao. Dinsha K. Tehrani was in charge of audiography. Art direction was done by F. Nagoor while Hiralal did the choreography.

Soundtrack 
Music was composed by C. R. Subbaraman and S. V. Venkatraman  Lyrics were written by Santhanakrishna Naidu, Papanasam Sivan, Kambadasan, Udumalai Narayana Kavi and K. D. Santhanam. Singers are T. R. Mahalingam, Nagercoil K. Mahadevan, N. S. Krishnan & T. A. Madhuram. Playback singers are M. L. Vasanthakumari, T. V. Rathnam, K. V. Janaki, P. Leela,  Jikki, S. V. Venkatraman & C. R. Subbaraman.

Comedy track 
Randor Guy says the film is remembered for the satire-rich comedy of NSK.

Notelist

References 

1950 films
Hindu mythological films
Indian epic films
1950s Tamil-language films
Indian black-and-white films
Films scored by S. V. Venkatraman
Films scored by C. R. Subbaraman